Gairaigo are Japanese words originating from, or based on, foreign-language (generally Western) terms. These include wasei-eigo (Japanese pseudo-anglicisms). Many of these loanwords derive from Portuguese, due to Portugal's early role in Japanese-Western interaction; Dutch, due to the Netherlands' relationship with Japan amidst the isolationist policy of sakoku during the Edo period; and from French and German, due to France and Germany's cultural and scientific prominence during Japan's modernization in the Meiji period.

However, most come from English, the dominant world language today. Due to the large number of western concepts imported into Japanese culture during modern times, there are thousands of these English borrowings. These English words are informally referred to as having been "Nipponized". A few of them, such as "salaryman", have nevertheless been borrowed into English together with their Japanese meanings.

Japanese vocabulary also includes large numbers of words from Chinese, borrowed at various points throughout history.  However, since the Japanese language has such strong historical ties to the Chinese language, these loans are not generally considered gairaigo.

Many loanwords are in fact pseudo-borrowings: despite their links to foreign language words, the word forms as used in modern Japanese are not used in the same way in their languages of origin. In fact, many such terms, despite their similarity to the original foreign words, are not easily understood by speakers of those languages (e.g. left over as a baseball term for a hit that goes over the left-fielder's head, rather than uneaten food saved for a later meal as in English—or famikon (from "family computer"), which actually refers to the Nintendo Entertainment System).

Note:
US = American English
UK = British English

Examples
Due to the extent of Japanese borrowings, particularly from English, this list focuses mainly on pseudo-borrowings and commonly used loanwords from languages other than English (which are often mistaken for English words in Japan). Most loanwords (and all modern loans) are transcribed in katakana, a Japanese syllabary. Older loans may be written using ateji, with Kanji used to represent their phonetic readings without necessarily inheriting their meaning. In words composed of both a loan and native Japanese, the Japanese can function as a morpheme within a compound (and would generally be written in Kanji if possible), or can be attached to the foreign word to inflect or otherwise modify it, as if it were okurigana (which is written in hiragana).

See also
List of Japanese Latin alphabetic abbreviations
List of English words of Japanese origin
Engrish
Japanese abbreviated and contracted words
Glossary of Japanese words of Portuguese origin
Glossary of Japanese words of Dutch origin

Notes

References
Takashi Ichikawa, et al. (1998). , Tokyo, Japan: Sanseido Co., Ltd. .

External links
English Loan Words in Japanese (Macmillan)

Japanese vocabulary
Society-related lists